Edward Vissers (4 July 1912 in Antwerp – 2 April 1994 in Antwerp) was a Belgian professional road bicycle racer. He finished in the top 10 of the Tour de France three times.

Major results

1934
Aarschot
Herve
Hoboken
Oostende
1935
Antwerpen
1936
Tongeren
Wilrijk
1937
Tour de France:
Winner stage 20
6th place overall classification
1938
Tour de France:
4th place overall classification
1939
Paris - Belfort (FRA)
Tour de France:
Winner stage 9
5th place overall classification
1942
Ingelmunster

External links
 
 Official Tour de France results for Edward Vissers

1912 births
1994 deaths
Cyclists from Antwerp
Belgian male cyclists
Belgian Tour de France stage winners
Tour de Suisse stage winners